Skeheenarinky GAA is a Gaelic Athletic Association club in County Tipperary, Ireland. The club, based in the townland of Skeheenarinky in the parish of Ballyporeen, is part of the South division of Tipperary GAA. The club fields hurling teams at various age levels and, in under-age football, collaborates with the neighbouring Ballyporeen GAA.

History

Honours

Tipperary Junior A Hurling Championship (2)
2014, 2021
South Tipperary Junior A Hurling Championship (10)
1981, 1990, 1994, 1996, 1999, 2000, 2017, 2018, 2019, 2021.
South Tipperary Minor A Hurling Championship (1) - 2018 (Skeheenarinky/Clonmel Og)
South Tipperary Minor B Hurling Championship (3)
1986 (Brian Borus), 2011, 2015 (Skeheenarinky/Clonmel Og)
Tipperary Minor Hurling C Championship (1)
2004
South Tipperary Minor Hurling C Championship (2)
2004, 2008
Tipperary Juvenile Hurling Championship (1)
2014
South Tipperary U21 Hurling B Championship (2)
2012, 2013
South Tipperary U21 Hurling C Championship (1)
2004

References

External links 
Official Site
Tipperary GAA site

Gaelic games clubs in County Tipperary